Erginus is a genus of sea snails, true limpets, marine gastropod mollusks in the family Erginidae.

Species
Species within the genus Erginus include:
 Erginus galkini Chernyshev & Chernova, 2002
 Erginus rubellus (Fabricius O., 1780)
Species brought into synonymy
 Erginus apicinus (Dall, 1879): synonym of Problacmaea apicina (Dall, 1879)
 Erginus moskalevi (Golikov & Kussakin, 1972): synonym of Problacmaea moskalevi Golikov & Kussakin, 1972
 Erginus puniceus Lindberg, 1988: synonym of Erginus sybariticus (Dall, 1871): synonym of Erginus sybariticus (Dall, 1871): synonym of Problacmaea sybaritica (Dall, 1871)
 Erginus sybariticus (Dall, 1871): synonym of Problacmaea sybaritica (Dall, 1871)

References

 Chernyshev, A.V. (2018). Erginidae fam. nov. (Patellogastropoda) – a new family of limpets. Bulletin of the Russian Far East Malacological Society. 22(1-2): 63-68

External links
 Jeffreys, J.G. (1877). New and peculiar Mollusca of the Patellidae and other families of Gastropoda procured in the Valorous expedition. Annals and Magazine of Natural History. ser. 4, 19: 231-243

Erginidae
Gastropod genera